Engerwitzdorf is a municipality in the district of Urfahr-Umgebung in the Austrian state of Upper Austria.
It is one of the largest municipalities in Upper Austria although it only has about 8000 inhabitants.

Geography
Engerwitzdorf is located near Upper Austria's capital city Linz and even nearer to the little but very popular city of Gallneukirchen.

Population

References

Cities and towns in Urfahr-Umgebung District